A news analyst examines, analyses and interprets broadcast news received from various sources. Sometimes also called newscasters or news anchor or Broadcast News Analyst. News analysts write commentaries, columns, or scripts.
They coordinate and sometimes serve as an anchor on news broadcast programs. They develop perspectives about news subjects through research, interviews, observation, and experience.

Sub domains
Current events
Sports
Business
Entertainment
Politics
Crime

References and external links 
 Careerplanner.com Job Description and Jobs for: "Broadcast News Analyst"  

Broadcast journalism
Journalism occupations
Mass media occupations
Broadcasting occupations

Reporting specialties